Stefano Moro (born 22 June 1997 in Fontanella) is an Italian cyclist, who currently rides for UCI Continental team . He competes in both road and track cycling, but specializes on the track.

Major results
2014
 1st  Kilometer, National Junior Track Championships
2015
 National Junior Track Championships
1st  Kilometer
1st  Team sprint (with Imerio Cima and Mattia Geroli)
2017
 5th Circuito del Porto
2019
 2nd  Team pursuit, European Games
 4th Circuito del Porto
2020
 1st Six Days of Fiorenzuola (with Davide Plebani)
 2nd  Team pursuit, UEC European Track Championships
 2019–20 UCI Track World Cup
2nd Team pursuit, Milton

References

External links

1997 births
Living people
Italian male cyclists
Italian track cyclists
European Games competitors for Italy
Cyclists at the 2019 European Games
European Games medalists in cycling
European Games silver medalists for Italy
Cyclists from the Province of Bergamo
21st-century Italian people